Stephen or Steven Mosher is the name of:

Steven W. Mosher (born 1948), social scientist, demographer, China scholar, and author
Stephen Mosher (photographer) (born 1964), American photographer
Steven M. Mosher, climatologist, technologist, statistician, and author